Kim Yong-Chan (born 8 April 1990) is a South Korean footballer who plays as full back for Chungju Hummel in K League Challenge.

Career
He was selected by FC Seoul in the 2012 K-League draft but did not appear for the capital team.

He moved to Gyeongnam FC before the 2013 season starts.

References

External links 

1990 births
Living people
Association football fullbacks
South Korean footballers
FC Seoul players
Gyeongnam FC players
Incheon United FC players
Chungju Hummel FC players
K League 1 players
K League 2 players
Ajou University alumni